Camilo Haddad is a monorail station of São Paulo Metro. Belongs to Line 15-Silver, which is actually in expansion, and should go to Cidade Tiradentes, with connection with Line 2-Green in Vila Prudente. It is placed in Av. Prof. Luis Inácio de Anhaia Mello, next to Rua Camilo Haddad. Because of the small demand (about 5,000 passengers per day), this station would be named by the press as mini-station.

It was opened by the Government of the State of São Paulo on April 6, 2018.

Toponymy
The station received the name of Camilo Haddad because of the homonym street, localized across to the station. Camilo Haddad was born on August 10, 1904 in Syria, and his family later migrated to Brazil. After being naturalized as Brazilian, graduated in Medicine in University of Brazil. During decades, kept his clinic in Vila Prudente, attending the community until 1974, when he died. On January 9, 1978, mayor Olavo Setúbal signed Executive Order no. 14,883, which officialized the naming of dozens of public streets, and in its subsection XXIX named "Doutor Camilo Haddad" the old B and 3 streets.

Station layout

References

São Paulo Metro stations
Railway stations opened in 2018